Posyolok Oblastnoy selskokhozyaystvennoy opytnoy stantsii is a rural locality (a settlement) and the administrative center of Novozhiznenskoye Rural Settlement, Gorodishchensky District, Volgograd Oblast, Russia. The population was 1,904 as of 2010. There are 30 streets.

Geography 
The settlement is located in steppe, 38 km northwest of Gorodishche (the district's administrative centre) by road. Kuzmichi is the nearest rural locality.

References 

Rural localities in Gorodishchensky District, Volgograd Oblast